Erkki Latvala (born 20 August 1965) is a Finnish biathlete. He competed in the men's sprint event at the 1994 Winter Olympics.

References

External links
 

1965 births
Living people
Finnish male biathletes
Olympic biathletes of Finland
Biathletes at the 1994 Winter Olympics
People from Teuva
Sportspeople from South Ostrobothnia